Ruggles of Red Gap is a 1935 American comedy western film directed by Leo McCarey and starring Charles Laughton, Mary Boland, Charlie Ruggles, and ZaSu Pitts and featuring Roland Young and Leila Hyams. It was based on the best-selling 1915 novel by Harry Leon Wilson, adapted by Humphrey Pearson, with a screenplay by Walter DeLeon and Harlan Thompson. It is the story of a newly rich American couple from the West who win a British gentleman's gentleman in a poker game.

Plot

Marmaduke Ruggles is a valet and butler to the Earl of Burnstead. During a stay in Paris, the Earl tells Ruggles that he has gambled him away in a drunken game of poker, and he is to report to his new masters - nouveau riche American millionaires Egbert and Effie Floud - immediately. Ruggles bemoans the idea of being relegated to "the land of slavery," but he takes his new occupation in stride, helping to get Egbert a new wardrobe and haircut.

Egbert slips away from Effie and takes Ruggles to a Parisian café. He explains to the valet that, in America, everyone is equal, and Ruggles should behave like a friend rather than a deferential servant. Ruggles is dismissive, but after a night of drinking with Egbert and his wild friend Jeff Tuttle, his "stiff upper lip" falls away as he follows the examples of Egbert and Tuttle. The three embark on an alcohol-fueled trip across Paris which ends with them returning to the Floud's hotel room and breaking up a society party hosted by Effie. The next day Ruggles is embarrassed, and he apologizes to Effie for his behavior.

The Flouds return to America and bring Ruggles with them to their home town of Red Gap. Ruggles meets the extended family of the Flouds, including "Ma" Pettingill, Effie's mother, and Charles Belknap-Jackson, a snooty relative of Effie's who treats Ruggles with disdain. A party held to receive the Flouds inadvertently turns into a warm welcome for Ruggles after Ruggles is mistaken for a wealthy retired Englishman. Ruggles also meets Mrs. Judson, a widowed housewife and cook. When Belknap-Jackson chastises Ruggles for dancing at the party with Mrs. Judson, Ruggles kicks him in the behind. He is almost fired, but his job is saved as a newspaper article describing Ruggles as an "honored houseguest" of the Flouds makes him a local celebrity.

Ruggles becomes a fixture in society, as Effie and Belknap-Jackson use his status to advance socially. He begin a relationship with Mrs. Judson and reads about the history of the United States. One day, after the rest of the family have left on a trip, Belknap-Jackson fires Ruggles. While waiting for the train, Ruggles wanders into the local saloon where he finds Mrs. Judson, Egbert, and Ma. Egbert laughs off Belknap-Jackson's actions, but Ruggles explains that he wants to live as a free and independent person and, because of that, he won't return to work for the Flouds. Egbert compares this to "what Lincoln said at Gettysburg," but neither he nor any of the other people in the saloon can remember the words. As they each try to remind themselves of what it says, Ruggles stands up and recites the entire Gettysburg Address from memory.

Ruggles decides to open a restaurant in Red Gap. As he is preparing the restaurant space with Mrs. Judson, Effie arrives with troubling news: the Earl of Burnstead is visiting Red Gap to buy Ruggles back from the Flouds. Ruggles reluctantly agrees to return to the Flouds, but Mrs. Judson is disgusted by his deference to his former employers. On the night of a party in the Earl's honor, Ruggles goes missing. Egbert convinces the Earl to slip out to another, more raucous party hosted by the beautiful young Nell Kenner, to whom the Earl instantly takes an interest. They eventually return to the Floud house, just as Ruggles returns and informs the Earl of his decision to "be someone" and live independently, on his own terms.

The restaurant opening proves to be a great success. All the friends he has made on his journey from England to America attend its gala opening. Belknap-Jackson also attends and insults Ruggles and his cooking to his face, so Ruggles throws him out. Ruggles retreats to the kitchen, sure that he has ruined his social standing in Red Gap. Outside, the diners begin to sing "For He's a Jolly Good Fellow," but Ruggles doesn't realise they are singing for him. Egbert pulls him out of the kitchen saying: "You idiot, they're singing it for you!" As the song crescendos, Egbert pushes Ruggles back into the kitchen so that he can celebrate privately with Mrs. Judson.

Cast
 Charles Laughton as Marmaduke Ruggles
 Mary Boland as Effie Floud
 Charlie Ruggles as Egbert Floud 
 ZaSu Pitts as Mrs. Judson
 Roland Young as Earl of Burnstead
 Leila Hyams as Nell Kenner
 Maude Eburne as "Ma" Pettingill
 Lucien Littlefield as Charles Belknap-Jackson
 Leota Lorraine as Mrs. Belknap-Jackson
 James Burke as Jeff Tuttle
 Dell Henderson as Sam
 Clarence Wilson as Jake Henshaw
 Heinie Conklin as Waiter (uncredited) 
 Willie Fung as Willie (uncredited)

Location
The film was shot on locations in Humboldt County, California.

Awards and nominations
Charles Laughton won the New York Film Critics' Circle Awards for Ruggles of Red Gap (along with Mutiny on the Bounty) in 1935. The National Board of Review named the film the ninth best of 1935. [That year, Laughton's other two films, Les Misérables and Mutiny on the Bounty were sixth and eighth on the list, respectively]. The film was nominated for the Oscar for Best Picture and competed against two other Laughton films that were also nominated: Mutiny on the Bounty (which won the award) and Les Misérables.

In 2014, the film was deemed "culturally, historically, or aesthetically significant" by the Library of Congress and selected for preservation in the National Film Registry.

Other adaptations
Harry Leon Wilson's novel Ruggles of Red Gap was adapted for the Broadway stage as a musical in 1915, the same year that it was published. It was first made into a silent film in 1918 and again in 1923 (the latter with Edward Everett Horton as Ruggles).

A musical adaptation called Fancy Pants starring Bob Hope and Lucille Ball was released in 1950.

Ruggles of Red Gap was adapted as a radio play several times. First on the July 10, 1939 episode of Lux Radio Theater; second on the December 17, 1945 episode of The Screen Guild Theater; and third on the June 8, 1946 episode of Academy Award Theater. All of these adaptations found Charles Laughton and Charlie Ruggles reprising their film parts.

A television musical version was produced on Producer's Showcase in 1957, starring Michael Redgrave, Peter Lawford, David Wayne and Jane Powell. The songs were created by Jule Styne and Leo Robin.

References

External links 

  – 1935 film
 
 
 
 
 DVD availability(from Universal Vault Series)

Streaming audio
 Ruggles of Red Gap on Lux Radio Theater: July 10, 1939 
 Ruggles of Red Gap on Screen Guild Theater: December 17, 1945  
 Ruggles of Red Gap on Academy Award Theater: June 8, 1946

1935 films
1935 comedy films
American Western (genre) comedy films
1930s Western (genre) comedy films
American black-and-white films
Films directed by Leo McCarey
Films set in 1908
Films set in Paris
Films set in Washington (state)
Films based on American novels
Paramount Pictures films
United States National Film Registry films
Films scored by Heinz Roemheld
1930s English-language films
1930s American films